Patrick Niall MacGinnis (29 March 1913 – 6 January 1977) was an Irish actor who made around 80 screen appearances.

Early life
MacGinnis was born in Dublin in 1913. He was educated at Stonyhurst College, a Jesuit public school in Lancashire in the North of England, and studied medicine at Trinity College Dublin (TCD), qualifying as a house surgeon. During the Second World War, MacGinnis served as a surgeon in the British Royal Navy.

In 1938 he starred in the hit comedy play Spring Meeting in the West End.

Acting career
Among his more notable film roles are:
 a German U-boat sailor in the British war film 49th Parallel (1941)
 Captain MacMorris in Henry V (1944)
 the title character in the film Martin Luther (1953)
 the villain Julian Karswell opposite American actor Dana Andrews in the British horror film Night of the Demon (1957, released in the United States as Curse of the Demon)
 Zeus in Jason and the Argonauts (1963)

On television, he played the arch-criminal A. J. Kent in the Danger Man episode "Battle of The Cameras" and Colonel Probst in The Saint episode "The Paper Chase".

Later life
In 1942, MacGinnis married Sheila Mcdonald; the couple later divorced. In 1955, he married his second wife Eleanor, with whom he had a daughter. In the mid-1970s, he gave up acting, moved back to his native Ireland, and returned to the medical profession. He lived in Ashford, County Wicklow, Ireland, until he died of cancer in Haverfordwest, Pembrokeshire, Wales, in January 1977,  aged 63, where he had been working in the medical profession. Eleanor remained in Ashford until her death in 2013. Their daughter and family still reside on the family property.

Complete filmography

 Turn of the Tide (1935) – John Lunn
 The Crimson Circle (1936) – Jack Beardmore
 Debt of Honour (1936) – Lt. Peter Stretton
 Ourselves Alone (1936) – Terence Elliott 
 The Luck of the Irish (1936) – Derek O'Neill
 The Edge of the World (1937) – The Gray Family: Andrew, His Son
 The Last Adventurers (1937) – Jeremy Bowker
 Spring Meeting (1938, TV Movie) – Michael Byrne
 Mountains O'Mourne (1938) – Paddy Kelly
 East of Piccadilly (1941) – Joe
 49th Parallel (1941) – Vogel
 The Day Will Dawn (1942) – Olaf
 We Dive at Dawn (1943) – Torpedo Gunner's Mate – C/P.O. Mike Corrigan
 Undercover (1943) – Dr. Jordon
 The Demi-Paradise (1943) – Man on ship-dedication stand (uncredited)
 The Hundred Pound Window (1944) – Chick Slater
 Tawny Pipit (1944) – Jimmy Bancroft
 Henry V (1944) – Macmorris – Irish Captain in the English Army
 Captain Boycott (1947) – Mark Killain
 Death at Newtownstewart (1948, TV Movie) – District Inspector Montgomery
 Anna Karenina (1948) – Levin
 Hamlet (1948) – Sea Captain
 No Room at the Inn (1948) – O'Rane
 Christopher Columbus (1949) – Juan de la Cosa
 Diamond City (1949) – Hans Muller
 Which Will Ye Have? (1949, Short) – Barabbas
 Chance of a Lifetime (1950) – Baxter
 Talk of a Million (1951) – Tom Cassidy
 No Highway in the Sky (1951) – Captain Samuelson, Pilot (uncredited)
 Murder in the Cathedral (1951) – Herald
 Martin Luther (1953) – Martin Luther
 Knights of the Round Table (1953) – Green Knight
 Hell Below Zero (1954) – Dr. Howe
 Conflict of Wings (1954) – Harry Tilney
 Betrayed (1954) – "Blackie"
 Special Delivery (1955) – Sidney
 Helen of Troy (1956) – Menelaus
 Alexander the Great (1956) – Parmenion
 Lust for Life (1956) – Roulin
 The Shiralee (1957) – Beauty Kelly
 Night of the Demon (1957) – Doctor Karswell
 She Didn't Say No! (1958) – James Casey
 Behind the Mask (1958) – Neil Isherwood
 The Nun's Story (1959) – Father Vermeuhlen (Leprosarium)
 Shake Hands with the Devil (1959) – Michael O'Leary
 Tarzan's Greatest Adventure (1959) – Kruger 
 This Other Eden (1959) – Devereaux
 Kidnapped (1960) – Mr. Shuan
 Never Take Sweets from a Stranger (1960) – Defense Counsel
 A Terrible Beauty (1960) – Ned O'Neill
 In the Nick (1960) – Prison Governor
 Foxhole in Cairo (1960) – Radek
 Sword of Sherwood Forest (1960) – Friar Tuck
 Johnny Nobody (1961) – Defending Counsel Sullivan
 The Webster Boy (1962) – Headmaster
 Billy Budd (1962) – Nathaniel Graveling – Ship's Master, Rights of Man
 The Devil's Agent (1962) – Paul Vass
 The Playboy of the Western World (1963) – Old Mahon
 Jason and the Argonauts (1963) – Zeus
 The Man Who Finally Died (1963) – Brenner 
 Face in the Rain (1963) – Klaus
 Becket (1964) – Baron
 The Truth About Spring (1965) – Cleary
 The Spy Who Came in from the Cold (1965) – Checkpoint Charlie Guard
 The War Lord (1965) – Odins
 A Man Could Get Killed (1966) – Ship's Captain
 Island of Terror (1966) – Mr. Roger Campbell
 The Viking Queen (1967) – Tiberian
 Torture Garden (1967) – Dr. Silversmith
 The Shoes of the Fisherman (1968) – Capuchin Monk
 Krakatoa, East of Java (1969) – Harbor Master
 Sinful Davey (1969) – Boots Simpson
 The Kremlin Letter (1970) – Erector Set
 Darling Lili (1970) – Von Hindenburg (uncredited)
 River of Mystery (1971, TV Movie) – Garwood Drum
 The Mackintosh Man (1973) – Warder
 Crisis in Sun Valley (1978, TV Movie) – James (final film role)

References

External links
 
 Niall MacGinnis(Aveleyman)

1913 births
1977 deaths
Deaths from cancer in Wales
Irish male film actors
Irish military doctors
Irish male stage actors
Irish surgeons
Irish expatriates in England
People educated at Stonyhurst College
Alumni of Trinity College Dublin
Royal Navy personnel of World War II
Male actors from Dublin (city)
20th-century Irish male actors
20th-century Irish medical doctors
20th-century surgeons